This is a list of notable bridges in New Zealand.

See also

 List of bridges
 List of New Zealand spans, a list of overhead powerline spans

References

New Zealand
Bri
Bri